This is a list of Indonesian football transfers featuring at least one Liga 1 or Liga 2 club. The transfer window of Liga 1 for pre season was opened from 10 February 2018 to 5 April 2018 and for mid season was opened from 5 July 2018 to 3 August 2018. The club without flag in table below are from Indonesia.

Transfers 
Note: Those clubs in bold is currently play in Liga 1 this season and in italic is currently play in Liga 2 this season.

Pre Season

During The Season 
For this season, kick off Liga 1 at 23 March 2018 and Liga 2 at 23 April 2018.

2018 Liga 1
Indonesia
Indonesia
Lists of Indonesian football transfers